Anthony Scott Crank (born 13 April 1974) is an English television presenter, journalist and actor, probably best known for his work on Channel 4's T4, MTV and Bingo Night Live on ITV1, and BBC1's Holiday.

Education
Crank trained at the Oldham Theatre Workshop.

Career
Crank  moved to London aged 23 and found work writing for magazines, ultimately becoming celebrity editor for OK!.  Manchester School Of Acting under the tuition of Mark Hudson
Crank was headhunted for Channel 4 youth strand T4 for 4 years and has also presented on MTV.  He is one of several presenters on BBC Holiday, Holiday Hit Squad and Departure Lounge and hosted a range of shows for the Eat Cinema channel as well as working as the main presenter on ITV's Bingo Night Live.  He also works for BBC Radio Manchester as a regular cover presenter.

Crank has returned to Manchester in order to pursue an acting career.  He has been cast as Bill, a policeman in the sixth series of Shameless. and made his theatre debut in Chris Hoyle's critically acclaimed play, 'The Newspaper Boy', opposite Suranne Jones and Joan Kempson. He recently took on the role of bad boy Levi in Hollyoaks E4 spin-off 'The Morning After The Night Before, and is soon to be seen as one of the central roles as debt collector 'Jimmy' in Simon Powell's Salford based feature film 'Poor, Wee Me', opposite Paul Hurstfield, Michelle Holmes, Tim Booth, Ian Mercer and Suranne Jones. He then featured in Hollyoaks again in 2010 as Steve, an arrogant TV Producer making a 'T4' style documentary with the characters Duncan and Theresa. He has also just played a small role as a policeman in Jimmy McGovern's new BBC drama, The Accused.

Anthony has recently worked with acclaimed director Trevor MacFarlane on JB Shorts 3, playing the role of a smarmy politician in "Backlash", a spoof party political broadcast written by  James Quinn (Early Doors, Fat Friends). The piece received much critical acclaim for the direction and performances in the Guardian, City Life, Whats On Stage to name just a few.

Crank has written for Miss and More and regularly contributes toAttitude.

Personal life
Anthony Crank is gay and supports various gay rights charities and movements, including The Albert Kennedy Trust; he also supports various Asperger syndrome charities. He hosts the mainstage Alternative Music Stage for Manchester Pride festival each year.

References

https://web.archive.org/web/20090218054746/http://www.whatsonstage.com/blogs/manchester/2009/02/10/review-the-newspaper-boy/

External links
Eat Cinema website
mini bio at channel 4
T4 Interview with Crank
Manchester School Of Acting

Living people
British television presenters
British LGBT broadcasters
English gay actors
British gay writers
1993 births
21st-century English LGBT people